Giuseppe Garinei (1846 – ?), was an Italian painter. He created still life paintings and scenes of small town mundanity. His work has been auctioned by Christie's as well as Bonhams.

References

1846 births
19th-century Italian painters
19th-century Italian male artists
Italian male painters
Year of death missing